Brian Dempsey (born 1947) is a Scottish businessman. Dempsey currently lives in Scotland after brief spells in Miami and the Caribbean He was a major funder of the Scottish Labour Party and a briefly director of Celtic FC in 1990.  He supported Fergus McCann's efforts to take over Celtic in the 1990s. He was declared bankrupt in June 2011, with debts in excess of £10 million.

References

Living people
Place of birth missing (living people)
Businesspeople from Glasgow
Celtic F.C. directors and chairmen
Scottish businesspeople
Directors of football clubs in Scotland
Scottish Labour
British real estate businesspeople
1947 births